Karsten Reuter (born 13 June 1970 in Offenbach am Main) is a German physicist and chemist.

Life and Work 

Reuter studied Physics at the Friedrich-Alexander-Universität Erlangen-Nürnberg and the University of York. He conducted his doctoral studies at the CSIC Instituto de Ciencia de Materiales de Madrid (ICMM) and in Erlangen, where he received his doctorate in 1995 under Prof. Dr. Klaus Heinz for his work on electronic transport across metal-semiconductor interfaces. After postdoctoral studies at the Fritz-Haber-Institut (FHI) der Max-Planck-Gesellschaft (MPG) in Berlin and at the FOM Institute for Atomic and Molecular Physics (AMOLF) in Amsterdam, he led an Independent MPG Research Group at the FHI from 2005 to 2009 and completed his Habilitation in Theoretical Solid State Physics at the FU Berlin in 2005. From 2009 to 2020 he held the Chair for Theoretical Chemistry at the Technische Universität München (TUM) und was a member of the TUM Catalysis Research Center. Since 2020 he is director and scientific member at the Berlin Fritz-Haber-Institut der MPG.

Karsten Reuter's research activities focus on a quantitative modeling of materials properties and functions. Specifically, he addresses processes in working catalysts and energy conversion devices such as electrolyzers, fuel cells or batteries. For this, he advances predictive-quality multiscale models and data science approaches, uniting methods and concepts from physics, chemistry, machine learning, as well as materials science and engineering.

Honors and awards 
For his work, Reuter received multiple awards and distinctions. In 2018 he was awarded the Frontiers Award for Chemical Energy Conversion. Recent visiting professorships include Stanford (2014–2015), the Massachusetts Institute of Technology (2018) and the Imperial College London (2019–2020).

References

External links 
 Fritz Haber Institute of the MPG
 

Max Planck Society people
1970 births
Living people
21st-century German physicists
21st-century German chemists
Max Planck Institute directors
University of Erlangen-Nuremberg alumni
Academic staff of the Technical University of Munich
People from Offenbach am Main